The Río Salado, also Río Salado de los Nadadores, or Salado River, is a river in northern Mexico, a tributary of the Rio Grande (Río Bravo). Its basin extends across the northern portion of Coahuila, Nuevo Leon, and Tamaulipas states.

It originates in the Sierra Madre Oriental in Coahuila and flows east-northeastward. It is joined by the Rio Sabinas in the reservoir created by the Venustiano Carranza Dam. The Salado flows southeast from the reservoir through northern Nuevo León and northwestern Tamaulipas, where it is joined by the Sabinas Hidalgo River, to join the Rio Grande in the Falcón Reservoir, at Rio Grande river kilometer 43.

Economic importance 
The river is used mainly for agricultural and mining activity, especially for irrigation of cotton. Fishing has been increasing because some species have been introduced such as gizzard shad, largemouth bass and white bass, among others. Water lilies have also been introduced.

Environmental impact 
The river faces a number of problems related to mismanagement. There is no system to regulate the exploitation of resources found there.

See also
 List of rivers of Mexico
 List of tributaries of the Rio Grande

References

Rivers of Tamaulipas
Tributaries of the Rio Grande